School District 42 Maple Ridge-Pitt Meadows is a school district in British Columbia east of Vancouver. This includes Maple Ridge and Pitt Meadows.

Data breach 
In January 2023, School District 42 Maple Ridge-Pitt Meadows suffered a data breach resulting in 19,126 records being leaked of Students and Staff: first name, last name; school/department; district email address; student grade (K-12); and Emails.

The District took notice of the breach on January 17, 2023. The data was distributed on a popular hacking forum.

Board of Education

Board of Education (2014-2018)
The trustees for School District No. 42 are Mike Murray (Chair), Susan Carr (Vice-Chair), Lisa Beare, Korleen Carreras, Ken Clarkson, Eleanor Palis and Dr. Dave Rempel. They were all elected in November 2014 for a four-year term. The Chief Executive Officer for the District is Sylvia Russell. Flavia Coughlan serves as the Secretary Treasurer.

Board of Education (2011-2014)
The trustees for School District No. 42 were Mike Murray (Chair), Eleanor Palis (Vice-Chair), Susan Carr, Ken Clarkson, Kathy Marshall, Sarah Nelson, and Dave Rempel. They were all elected in November 2011 for a three-year term. The Chief Executive Officer for the District was Jan Unwin. Flavia Coughlan served as the Secretary Treasurer.

Issues and research
Former Maple Ridge trustee Katherine Wagner (elected: 1996-2005 before retiring from political office) writes School Watch column, printed bi-weekly in The Maple Ridge and Pitt Meadows Times

Schools

See also
List of school districts in British Columbia

References

External links
School District 42, official website
International Education office
School Watch, periodical column, published in Maple Ridge Pitt Meadows Times

Maple Ridge, British Columbia
Pitt Meadows
42